William Hart (June 9, 1866February 6, 1899) was a machinist first class serving in the United States Navy during the Spanish–American War who received the Medal of Honor for bravery.

Biography
Hart was born June 9, 1866, in Massachusetts and after entering the navy was sent to fight in the Spanish–American War aboard the torpedo boat U.S.S. Marblehead as a machinist first class.

He died February 6, 1899, and is buried in Green-Wood Cemetery Brooklyn, New York.

Medal of Honor citation
Rank and organization: Machinist First Class, U.S. Navy. Born: 9 June 1866, Massachusetts. Accredited to: Massachusetts. G.O. No.: 521, 7 July 1899.

Citation:

On board the U.S.S. Marblehead during the operation of cutting the cable leading from Cienfuegos, Cuba, 11 May 1898. Facing the heavy fire of the enemy, Hart set an example of extraordinary bravery and coolness throughout this action.

See also

List of Medal of Honor recipients for the Spanish–American War

References

External links

1866 births
1899 deaths
People from Massachusetts
United States Navy Medal of Honor recipients
United States Navy sailors
American military personnel of the Spanish–American War
Spanish–American War recipients of the Medal of Honor
Burials at Green-Wood Cemetery